899 Naval Air Squadron (899 NAS) was a squadron of the Fleet Air Arm of the United Kingdom.

It was most recently based at RNAS Yeovilton (HMS Heron) as the British Aerospace Sea Harrier FA2 training squadron until it was decommissioned in March 2005 prior to the stand-up of 800 Naval Air Squadron with the Harrier GR7 at RAF Cottesmore.

History

Second World War
899 Naval Air Squadron was first formed on 15 December 1942 at RNAS Hatston using crew from 880 Naval Air Squadron and was equipped with the Supermarine Seafire IIC. The squadron embarked on the aircraft carrier  in March that year, continuing to work up until the carrier sailed for the Mediterranean Sea to take part in the Allied invasion of Sicily in July 1943. Indomitable formed part of the covering force protecting the landings from any intervention by Italian naval forces. Indomitable was damaged by German air attack on 16 July, and 899 Squadron disembarked at Gibraltar on 29 July as the carrier returned to Britain for repair. In August 1943, the squadron re-equipped with Seafire LIICs, which had better performance at low altitudes than its earlier aircraft, embarking on the escort carrier  to take part in Operation Avalanche, the Allied landings at Salerno, Italy which took place from 9 September. Hunter formed part of Task Force V, consisting of five small carriers that were tasked with providing fighter cover over the beachhead until airfields could be captured and brought into use. The squadron's Seafires proved effective in disrupting attacks by German fighter-bombers, although no German aircraft were shot down. Once an airstrip had been built ashore at Paestum on, five of the squadron's Seafires were operated from the airstrip until relieved by RAF Spitfires  and USAAF P-40s on 15 September. Operation of Seafires from small escort carriers resulted in a large number of landing accidents, with a particular problem being propellers being damaged by the propeller blades hitting the flight deck on landing, causing Hunters stock of spare propellers being exhausted. The squadron returned to Britain on 6 October 1943.

The squadron remained shore based in Northern Ireland for several months, temporarily receiving Spitfires in December owing to a shortage of Seafires, before re-equipping with Seafire LIIIs in March 1944. In April 1944 the squadron embarked on the escort carrier , and underwent an extensive programme of deck-landing and ground attack training. It disembarked to RAF Peterhead on 31 May, flying fighter patrols while Khedive underwent a period of defect repair, before re-embarking on the carrier on 6 July. On 15 July Khedive left for the Mediterranean to take part in Operation Dragoon, the Allied invasion of Southern France. The squadron helped to provide fighter cover for the invasion fleet and to carry out ground attack missions in support of the advancing Allied troops when the Dragoon landings started on 15 August. By the time Khedive was released from operations in support of Dragoon, on 23 August, 899 Squadron's Seafires had carried out 201 operation sorties for the loss of four aircraft, dropping 24 500 lb and 44 250 lb bombs. In September 1944, Khedive took part in Operation Outing, an offensive by the Royal Navy against German forces in the Aegean, with 899 Squadron flying combat air patrol and attack against surface targets in Crete and Rhodes from 14 to 19 September.

The squadron disembarked from Khedive at RNAS Long Kesh on 12 October 1944. After a further period of training, the squadron embarked on the escort carrier  for passage to join the British Pacific Fleet. On arrival in Australia, 899 Squadron became a pool squadron based at RAAF Station Schofields near Sydney, with its aircraft and pilots gradually dispatched to reinforce Seafire squadrons embarked on the British Pacific Fleet's operational Fleet carriers. From mid-May 1945, it was given the additional task of training pilots of the Royal Australian Naval Volunteer Reserve to fly Seafires from aircraft carriers. As the Australian pilots were all experienced Royal Australian Air Force pilots who had volunteered to join the Navy, the training process was relatively trouble free, with most of the pilots trained joining the carriers of the British Pacific Fleet after the end of the year, and several going on to have long careers with Australia's own Fleet Air Arm. It disbanded at Schofields on 27 September 1945.

Cold War

Sea Hawk (1955–1957)

On 7 November 1955, the squadron was recommissioned at RNAS Brawdy, equipped with 12 Hawker Sea Hawk FGA.6 jet fighters. After a five-month work up programme, including carrier landing training aboard  in January 1956, the squadron (together with 897 NAS, embarked aboard the carrier  on 16 April 1956. The carrier then sailed to join the Mediterranean Fleet. The Egyptian nationalisation of the Suez Canal on 26 July 1956 caused the Suez Crisis, resulting in Operation Musketeer, the Anglo-French invasion of the Suez Canal zone. On 1 November, 899 Squadron carried out rocket attacks on Inchas and Cairo West airfields, continuing with ground attack missions until a ceasefire came into action on 7 September. The squadron flew 165 sorties without suffering any losses, although several of its aircraft received minor damage. Lieutenant Commander Arthur Bernard Bruce Clark, the commanding officer of 899 Squadron, was mentioned in despatches for his actions during the operation. After covering the Anglo-French evacuation from Egypt in December 1956, Eagle returned to Britain, with 899 Squadron disembarking to RNAS Brawdy on 3 January 1957 and disbanding there on 5 January.

Sea Vixen (1961–1972)
899 NAS reformed on 1 February 1961 at RNAS Yeovilton with the de Havilland Sea Vixen FAW.1 all weather fighter, as the Vixen Headquarters Squadron, tasked with evaluating equipment and tactics and equipped with five Sea Vixens. The unit participated in the 1961 Farnborough Airshow in September that year, and in the following year's show.

In February 1964, the squadron began to convert to the Sea Vixen FAW.2, and after working out tactics and procedures for the new version, changed role to a fully operational squadron, with the squadron's strength increasing to 14 Sea Vixens. It embarked on the newly reconstructed Eagle in December that year, as the carrier sailed for the Far East. Eagle returned to Britain in May for a docking and maintenance period, with 899 re-embarking on 25 August 1965, as Eagle again left for the Far East. On 12 November 1965, Rhodesia (now Zimbabwe) made a Unilateral Declaration of Independence, and Eagle was ordered to stand by off the coast of Zambia in order to defend Zambia if hostilities with Rhodesia broke out. Eagle was relieved from this duty in December. In March 1966, Eagle relieved the carrier  in providing air support to the Beira Patrol blockade aimed at enforcing a UN oil embargo against Rhodesia, remaining at sea for a record 72 days.

In 1967, with the disintegration of the Protectorate of South Arabia, HMS Eagle deployed to the Gulf of Aden. Throughout November 1967, 899 NAS flew reconnaissance flights over Aden with RAF Hawker Hunters of No. 43 Squadron. The squadron continually maintained a patrol of four Vixens over Aden to cover the withdrawal of British forces. On 29 November, four Sea Vixens of 899 NAS were the last British military aircraft to leave Aden, with one carrying the Union Jack back to HMS Eagle.

899 NAS was decommissioned on 23 January 1972.

Training squadron

Sea Harrier FRS1 (1980–1993)

899 NAS was recommissioned on 31 March 1980 with the British Aerospace Sea Harrier FRS.1, taking over from 700A Flight, the Sea Harrier Intensive Training Unit. It was the Sea Harrier Headquarters Squadron, converting pilots onto the Sea Harrier (they would first receive instruction on how to fly STOVL aircraft with the RAF's 233 Operational Conversion Unit where they would fly two seat Harrier T4 trainers), as well as carrying out continuing trials of the Sea Harrier. From August 1981, the squadron also received  Hawker Hunter T.8M, fitted with the Sea Harrier's Ferranti Blue Fox radar.

In April 1982, Argentina invaded the Falkland Islands, resulting in the Falklands War. While 899 Squadron did not take part directly in the war, most of its personnel and aircraft joined 800 NAS (HMS Hermes) and 801 NAS (HMS Invincible) for service in the South Atlantic. From May 1982, the squadron recommenced training activities, using Sea Harriers borrowed from the Aeroplane and Armament Experimental Establishment to train pilots for 809 Naval Air Squadron, specially formed for the Falklands War. In early July, the squadron received 8 RAF Harrier GR.3s on loan to help train the air wing for the new carrier , until the return of Hermes on 21 July provided sufficient Sea Harriers for the squadron to return to normal. In September 1983, it received its own two-seaters, three Harrier T4Ns, which were supplemented in 1987 by ex-RAF T4As, with the squadron taking full responsibility for the entire training task for Sea Harrier pilots in 1989.

Sea Harrier FA2 (1993–2005)
In June 1993 an Operational Evaluation Unit (OEU) for the British Aerospace Sea Harrier FA.2 was set up within the squadron, although the OEU operated out of Boscombe Down rather than Yeovilton, with the main squadron receiving FA.2s from September that year and beginning conversion training on the new mark in March 1994, continuing its role as the Harrier Operational Conversion Unit. In September 1994, four OEU Sea Harriers deployed aboard Invincible, as the carrier cruised in the Adriatic Sea as part of Operation Deny Flight, the NATO enforcement of a UN no-fly zone over Bosnia and Herzegovina during the Bosnian War. The OEU's four Sea Harriers operated with the six Sea Harrier FRS.1s of 800 Squadron during the deployment, with two FA.2s being fired on by S-75 Dvina surface-to-air missiles on 22 November. From 1995, the squadron received Harrier T.8 two seat trainers, a conversion of existing Harrier T.4s to better replicate the Sea Harrier FA.2's avionics.

On 23 March 2005, 899 NAS was disbanded at RNAS Yeovilton, seeing two flypasts – one of the squadron's remaining aircraft (two FA2s and two T8s) and the other composed of former 899 aircraft (Sea Hawk, Sea Vixen and Hunter).

Aircraft flown
List of aircraft operated by 809 NAS:

 Supermarine Seafire L.IIc (Dec 1942–Jan 1994)
 Supermarine Spitfire Mk.Vb (Dec 1943–Mar 1944)
 Supermarine Seafire L.III (Feb 1944–Sep 1945)
 Hawker Sea Hawk FGA.6 (Nov 1955–Jan 1957)
 de Havilland Sea Vixen FAW.1 (Feb 1961–1964)
 de Havilland Sea Vixen FAW.2 (Feb 1964–Jan 1972)
 British Aerospace Sea Harrier FRS.1 (Mar 1980–June 1993)
 Hawker Siddeley Harrier T.4N (Mar 1980–1995)
 Hawker Hunter T.8M (Mar 1980–199?)
 British Aerospace Sea Harrier FA2 (June 1993–Mar 2005)
 Hawker Siddeley Harrier T.8 (May 1995–Mar 2005)

References

 
 
 
 
 
 
 
 

800 series Fleet Air Arm squadrons